Uptown may refer to:

Neighborhoods or regions in several cities

United States
 Uptown, entertainment district east of Downtown and Midtown Albuquerque, New Mexico
 Uptown Charlotte, North Carolina
 Uptown, area surrounding the University of Cincinnati in Cincinnati, Ohio
 Uptown, Chicago, Illinois
 Uptown, Richmond, Virginia
 Uptown, Dallas, Texas
 Uptown, Harrisburg, Pennsylvania
 Uptown, Hartford, Connecticut
 Uptown Houston, Texas
 Uptown Kingston, New York
 Uptown Lexington, Kentucky
 Uptown Manhattan, New York City, New York
 Uptown, Memphis, Tennessee
 Uptown, Minneapolis, Minnesota, area surrounding Hennepin Avenue at Lake Street
 Uptown New Orleans, Louisiana
 Uptown, New Orleans, a neighborhood
 Uptown Oakland, California
 Uptown Pittsburgh, Pennsylvania, also known as The Bluff
 Uptown, Seattle, Washington, also known as Lower Queen Anne, Seattle
 Uptown Tampa, Florida
 Uptown, Wichita, Kansas
 Uptown, a neighborhood in Youngstown, Ohio
 Northwest, Washington, D.C., colloquially known as Uptown
 Buckhead, Atlanta, Georgia, North of Midtown and Downtown

Canada
 Uptown, Charlottetown, Prince Edward Island
 Uptown, Montreal, Quebec (see Côte-des-Neiges)
 Uptown, Montreal, Quebec (see Golden Square Mile)
 Uptown, Saint John, New Brunswick
 Uptown Toronto, Ontario
 Uptown, Vancouver, British Columbia (see Mount Pleasant, Vancouver)
 Uptown Waterloo, Ontario
 Uptown Port Alberni, British Columbia
 Uptown, Victoria, British Columbia

Music
 Uptown (band), Korean hip hop and R&B group
 Uptown (Billy Taylor album), 1960
 Uptown (André Previn album), 1990
 Uptown (Machinations album), 1988
 "Uptown", a 1960 song by Roy Orbison
 "Uptown" (The Crystals song), 1962
 "Uptown" (Prince song), 1980
"Uptown", 2009 song by Drake from his So Far Gone mixtape
 Uptown Records, American hip hop/R&B record label
 Uptown Records (jazz), American Jazz record label

Buildings
 Hochhaus Uptown München, skyscraper in Munich
 Uptown Theatre (disambiguation)s in various cities

Media
 Uptown (1987 film), Spanish film
 Uptown (2009 film), American independent drama film written and directed by Brian Ackley 
 Uptown (newspaper), alternative weekly in Winnipeg, Manitoba, Canada

See also
 "Uptown Girl", 1983 song by Billy Joel
 Downtown (disambiguation)
 Midtown (disambiguation)